The Rhode Island Rams football team represents Rhode Island University in college football. The team competes in the Colonial Athletic Association as part of the NCAA Division I Football Championship Subdivision. The program has had twenty head coaches since it began play during the 1895 college football season. Since the start of the 2014 season, Jim Fleming has served as head coach of the Rams.

Key

Coaches

Notes

References

Rhode Island

Rhode Island Rams football coaches